Cool John Ferguson (born December 3, 1953) is an American blues guitarist, singer and songwriter. He has released five albums under his own name and played on around twenty others.  He is the Director of Creative Development for the Music Maker Relief Foundation, and plays his guitar "upside down".

Taj Mahal stated that Ferguson ranks "among the five greatest guitarists in the world. He is a force to be reckoned with in the music industry. He is with the ranks of Jimi Hendrix, Wes Montgomery, and Django Reinhardt." At various times, Ferguson has played the guitar backing Taj Mahal, B.B. King, Kenny "Blues Boss" Wayne, Beverly Watkins and the Stylistics.

Life and career
Ferguson was born in Beaufort, South Carolina, United States. His father, John Wesley Ferguson, was head deacon at the Beaufort New Church of Christ, whilst his mother, Martha Jenkins Ferguson, hailed from Saint Helena Island.  The connection to Gullah culture remained strong in Ferguson's life. He had learned to play the guitar by the age of three, but "had to be sat in someone's lap while they sat in a chair." He was naturally left handed, and learned to play on a right handed guitar held upside down. Two years later he was playing gospel music as a professional, and became a featured entertainer with his siblings billed as 'Little John and the Ferguson Sisters' on "The Lowcountry Sing" on Channel 5, a Charleston, South Carolina-based radio station. He expanded his musical knowledge in the early 1960s, by surreptitiously listening to WAPE, "the Big Ape", out of Jacksonville, Florida. At Beaufort High School, Ferguson played the trumpet in a marching band and learned to read music. By 1972, he had joined the Earl Davis Trio. This jazz based beginning led to a five-year stint with Stephen Best and the Soul Crusaders who played across South Carolina.  He also played on the tent revival circuit, and recorded with LaFace Records.

To supplement his income from music, Ferguson worked in landscaping and construction as a young man. He relocated to near Durham, North Carolina for a spell, and Ferguson noted that "the local people were, you know, checking me out and saying 'you've got a cool walk,' 'you've got a cool talk.' So they summarized it to Cool John." In addition to supplying studio backing work for various musicians, including Little Pink Anderson and Frank Edwards, Ferguson started to appear under his own name.  He has toured widely, performing at the Byron Bay Bluesfest, Lincoln Center Out-Of-Doors, Lucerne Blues Festival, Switzerland's Blues to Bop Festival, the Savannah Music Festival, Columbia Blues Festival, and at the Lincoln Center for the Performing Arts. He keeps a connection to his roots by having a regular Saturday night engagement at the All People's Grill, a roadhouse situated north of Durham, North Carolina.

At the Penn Center on Saint Helena Island, Ferguson was recruited almost 25 years ago to join a fledgling Music Maker Relief Foundation. Ferguson has worked as Music Maker's Director of Creative Development since the 1990s. In 2003, Ferguson performed at the AmeriServ Johnstown Folkfest. In the early 2000s, he released his albums Guitar Heaven; the seasonal effort, Cool Yule; plus Cool John Ferguson; all issued by Music Maker. In 2007, Ferguson relocated to Atlanta with his wife, where he started his own record label, Cool John Recordings. Ferguson's own With These Hands was the first release for the new label. The album contained fifteen original tracks, ten of them incorporating vocals, encompassing blues, R&B, funk, rock and occasional Latin rhythms.

Ferguson was noted by Living Blues magazine for two years running as 'Most Outstanding Guitarist.' His work with Music Maker has seen him responsible for scores of albums being recorded by lesser known blues, folk and country artists, many of them at the veteran stage of their careers.  He played in a fundraiser for the Foundation in Washington, D.C. with Ironing Board Sam, and was featured in a photographic essay called "Music Makers", which was picked up by Garden & Gun magazine. Ferguson appeared in the documentary film, Toot Blues (2008), about the formation and early days of the Music Maker Relief Foundation.

To mark the occasion of fellow Beaufort native, Joe Frazier's death in 2011, Ferguson played an electric version of "The Star-Spangled Banner" at the Henry C. Chambers Waterfront Park. In addition, Ferguson regularly plays in two churches in Atlanta each Sunday.

Often dressed in his trademark flat-brimmed stetson hat, Ferguson continues to play his Fender Stratocaster upside down.

Discography

Albums

See also
 List of electric blues musicians

References

External links
 Official website
 

1953 births
Living people
Electric blues musicians
American blues guitarists
American male guitarists
20th-century American guitarists
21st-century American guitarists
African-American guitarists
American blues singers
20th-century African-American male singers
20th-century American singers
21st-century American singers
Guitarists from South Carolina
Singers from South Carolina
Songwriters from South Carolina
People from Beaufort, South Carolina
20th-century American male singers
21st-century American male singers
African-American songwriters
21st-century African-American male singers
American male songwriters